Celestino Martínez (born 7 May 1914, date of death unknown) was an Argentine footballer. He played in 13 matches for the Argentina national football team from 1937 to 1943. He was also part of Argentina's squad for the 1937 South American Championship.

References

1914 births
Year of death missing
Argentine footballers
Argentina international footballers
Place of birth missing
Association football defenders
Club Atlético Independiente footballers
Fluminense FC players
Argentine expatriate footballers
Expatriate footballers in Brazil